Mark Cumming (27 July 1872 – 10 March 1939) was an Australian rules footballer who played with St Kilda in the Victorian Football League (VFL).

Family
The son of Robert Cumming, and Agnes Cumming, née Bennett, Mark Cumming was born on 27 July 1872. He married Augusta Emily Willaton (1875-1947) in 1912.

References

External links 

1872 births
1939 deaths
Australian rules footballers from Western Australia
St Kilda Football Club players
Perth Football Club players